Frederick Fleming Meade (March 2, 1891 – death unknown), nicknamed "Chick", was an American Negro league infielder between 1914 and 1922.

A native of Fairmont, West Virginia, Meade made his Negro leagues debut in 1914 for the Philadelphia Giants. He went on to play for the Indianapolis ABCs, Hilldale Club, and Baltimore Black Sox, and finished his career in 1922 with the Harrisburg Giants.

References

External links
  and Seamheads

1891 births
Place of death missing
Year of death missing
Baltimore Black Sox players
Harrisburg Giants players
Hilldale Club players
Indianapolis ABCs players
Philadelphia Giants players
Baseball infielders
Sportspeople from Fairmont, West Virginia
Baseball players from West Virginia